Nibagdo is a town in the Sabou Department of Boulkiemdé Province in central western Burkina Faso. It has a population of 1,441.

References

Populated places in Boulkiemdé Province